Phosphorylated adapter RNA export protein is a protein that in humans is encoded by the PHAX gene.

References

Further reading